Paraskoviivka,  (Belarusian: , Armenian: Պարսկովևկա) also romanized and spelled as Paraskoviyvka, Paraskovyivka, Paraskoviyivka and Paraskoveevka, is a selo (village) in Bakhmut Raion, Donetsk Oblast, Eastern Ukraine. The settlement is north of the city of Bakhmut, south of Soledar, west of the settlement of Krasna Hora     and east of the city of Sloviansk. It had a population of at least 2,810 people in January 2022, with the village having a majority Russian, Ukrainian, Belarusian and Armenian majority confirmed in the 2001 census.

Beginning on 15 January 2023, the city suffered a number of attacks and offensives around it, with attacks increasing in January 2023. After attacks in the northern towns of the settlement increased and rising captures inside of Bakhmut, caused a two-week long siege of Paraskoviivka in late February 2023. The settlement was highly affected with several civilian casualties reported. On 18 February 2023 the Russian forces and PMC Wagner captured Paraskoviivka.

Geography 

Paraskoviivka is located in Bakhmut Raion, Donetsk Oblast, Eastern Ukraine. Paraskoviivka is served by the Donets Railway, with a railway station called ¨Stantsiia Shevchenko¨ (Russian: Станция Шевченко) in the central part of the settlement, which connects with the settlement of Sil and Krasna Hora, and then to Bakhmut. Following that there are monuments also within the city.

Berkhivka 

The settlement's population has fallen from 118 registered in the 2001 census, to 43 in 2022. Since 25 February 2023, the village has been controlled by Russia.

Russian forces were reported to have shelled Berkhivka on 17 February, with an airstrike also reported near the village. On 24 February 2023, PMC Wagner claimed that they had taken the village after a few days of fighting.

History

Ukrainian SSR 
50 residents of the settlement died during the Holodomor, resulting in an overall decrease in the population even after the collapse of the Soviet Union .

Russo-Ukrainian War

War in Donbas (2014-2017) 

During the 2014 Russian invasion, Paraskoviivka was used by Ukrainian forces to store supplies, while separatist and Ukrainian forces struggled for control of nearby Artemivsk. Russian and DPR forces ultimately withdrew from the area after the Siege of Sloviansk.  Fighting continued in the area until 2017.

2022 Russian invasion of Ukraine and the Battles of Soledar and Bakhmut 

Nearby Bakhmut was shelled on 17 May 2022, and the surrounding area came under shellfire the following months, culminating in the battle for Bakhmut. On 1 August 2022, Russian forces launched attacks on Bakhmut and the settlements south and southeast of it.

As part of a winter escalation in late December 2022, the Russians launched an offensive to capture the Soledar - Bakhmut region, a strategic target because of its position in Donetsk Oblast. On 11–16 January 2023, Russian forces were reported to have captured Soledar. With the capture of Sil, a village some 6 kilometers from Paraskoviivka, the railway line was cut off. On 24 January 2023, fighting reached Paraskoviivka, which had been almost completely encircled. Nearby Krasna Hora had also come under heavy attack. Ukrainian forces were reported to have repelled several attacks in the area that day, but were under heavy pressure.

Battle and Siege of Paraskoviivka (2023)

First Offensive/Attacks & Battle into Paraskoviivka (15 January 2023 -  29 January 2023) 
On 14 January 2023, Russian forces were reported to have pushed south of Soledar and engaged at Blahodatne to block the key Donets Railway stations in Bakhmut and Paraskoviivka, contributing to the siege in the city later on. Blahodatne was captured between 31 January and 2 February by Russian forces. Due to the large push against the settlement 1 person died on January 14.

Large advances and casualties (16 January 2023 - 31 January 2023) 
After the fall of Soledar on 16 January 2023 attempts to push even further were successful, with the captures of Blahodatne and Krasnopolivka. This resulted in pushes around and within Bakhmut, which includes Krasna Hora and Paraskoviivka creating a front between both. By 18 January 2023, Krasna Hora was under fire control by Russian forces and they had pushed across the strategic highway between Bakhmut and Slovyansk, trying to move from Pidhorodne.

By 23 January 2023, they had managed to reach the Bakhmutka river border of Paraskoviivka and had reached the outskirts of Paraskoviivka, nearly inside of it. They were also reported to have killed one civilian inside the city. Right the next day the Russians were reported to have established fire control over southeastern Paraskoviivka. Small advances continued on around the area between 25–29 January 2023, with 3 civilians dying on 27 January 2023 due to attacks, 1 dying on 28 January 2023 and another attack on 29 January 2023 left 1 dead.

Second Offensive on Paraskoviivka (31 January 2023 - 7 February 2023) 
On 31 January 2023, one person was reported dead after days of attacks in Paraskoviivka, Bakhmut and Vuhledar along with one seriously wounded on 6 February.

Attacks intensified across the next few days and on 2 February it was reported that Krasna Hora was encircled and the Russians were pushing to encircle Paraskoviivka from the north and the south. On 4 February, Russian forces and PMC Wagner were reported to have started a large assault on the settlement, and by 7 February they had established full fire control over the city and entered the northern part of the city.

Siege of Paraskoviivka (10 February 2023 - 18 February 2023) 

By 10 February 2023, Paraskoviivka and Krasna Hora were reported to have been partly encircled. On 11 February 2023, Russian forces captured all of northern Paraskoviivka as the Ukrainian forces were reported be encircled inside the southern part.

The settlements were on a strategic highway between Bakhmut - Slovyansk, and on the same day, it was reported that PMC Wagner had captured Krasna Hora. Paraskoviivka was then attacked from all sides. Initial reports suggested that there were at least 1,500 Ukrainian soldiers inside the settlement, which was later dismissed. On 13 February 2023, Ukrainian forces launched a small counter-attack which pushed the Russians out of M03 highway but a large counter-attack came later on in the day making the Russians re-establish control over it, on the same day, president Volodymyr Zelenskyy announced the situation in Paraskoviivka as very ''difficult''. By the next day the settlement came under siege, with fire control in the south, control over the entire north, the west under fire control and the east under massive pressure.

Paraskoviivka was reported to have been captured on 17 February, after heavy fighting during the preceding two days. and a heavy siege which had caused damage in the settlement, but fighting officially ended on 18 February.

References 

Villages in Bakhmut Raion